This is a list of cemeteries in Kenya.

Malindi

Islamic Cemetery in Malindi

Nairobi
 Bohra Cemetery  - serving the Bohra community
 City Park Cemetery
 Jewish Cemetery Forest Road
 Nairobi Muslim Cemetery
 Nairobi South Cemetery 
 Nairobi South Jewish Cemetery (old Jewish cemetery)
 Nairobi War Cemetery
 St Austin's Mission Cemetery, Mũthangari

Nakuru
 Gilgil War Cemetery
 Nakuru North Cemetery
 Nakuru South Cemetery
 Gilgil Cemetery
 Naivasha Cemetery
 Longonot Cemetery
 Molo Cemetery
 Njoro Cemetery
 Bahati Cemetery

Nyeri
 Baden-Powell grave at St Peter's Cemetery
 Nyeri War Cemetery

Great Rift Valley
 Lothagam North Pillar Site

References

External links

Kenya
 
Cemeteries